The 1991 Kerry Senior Football Championship was the 91st staging of the Kerry Senior Football Championship since its establishment by the Kerry County Board in 1889. The championship ran from 29 June to 22 September 1991.

West Kerry entered the championship as the defending champions, however, they were beaten by Dr. Crokes in a first round replay.

The final was played on 22 September 1991 at Austin Stack Park in Tralee, between Dr. Crokes and Castleisland Desmonds, in what was their first ever meeting in the final. Dr. Crokes won the match by 2-10 to 1-10 to claim their fifth championship title overall and a first title in 77 years.

Ger O'Shea was the championship's top scorer with 0-22.

Results

Prelininary round

First round

Quarter-finals

Semi-finals

Final

Championship statistics

Top scorers

Overall

In a single game

Miscellaneous

 Dr. Crokes won the title for the first time in 77 years.
 Castleisland Desmonds qualified for the final for the first time.

References

Kerry Senior Football Championship
1991 in Gaelic football